Erma Vernice Franklin (March 13, 1938 – September 7, 2002) was an American gospel and soul singer. Franklin was the elder sister of American singer/musician Aretha Franklin. Franklin's best known recording was the original version of "Piece of My Heart", written and produced by Bert Berns, and recorded in 1967, for which she was nominated for a Grammy Award. A cover version of the same song was recorded the following year by Big Brother and the Holding Company, with the lead vocal by Janis Joplin.

Biography

Early life and family
Erma Franklin was born in Shelby, Mississippi, United States, the oldest daughter of Barbara (née Siggers) and the Reverend C. L. Franklin. She was raised in Detroit, Michigan, where her father was pastor of the New Bethel Baptist Church. She was raised by both parents until the age of 10, when her parents separated for the final time. Her mother took her eldest sibling, half-brother Vaughn, with her to Buffalo, New York, in 1948. Barbara Siggers-Franklin died four years later, on March 7, 1952, in Buffalo. Franklin studied Business at Clark Atlanta University (then known as Clark College).

Career
During her childhood, Erma and her sisters Aretha and Carolyn sang at New Bethel Baptist Church. Later, when Aretha became a recording artist, Erma provided backing vocals and toured with her. Among her more notable back-up performances for her sister was on Aretha's signature tune "Respect".

In 1967, Erma Franklin sang the original version of "Piece of My Heart", which was a top 10 soul hit in the U.S. and rose to number 62 on the U.S. Billboard Hot 100 chart. The track was co-written and produced by Bert Berns. In the UK, Franklin's version was used in a Levi's jeans commercial ("Cinderella" AKA "Night and Day"), leading to a resurgence of interest in the song. The single was re-released in the UK in 1992 and peaked on the UK Singles Chart at number 9.

Franklin told an interviewer that when she first heard Janis Joplin's version on the radio, she did not recognize it because of the vocal arrangement.

In the mid-1970s, Franklin left the music industry, apart from occasional engagements with her sister. She was one of the special guests on Aretha's 1986 Showtime cable television special — filmed at Detroit's Music Hall — and also performed on June 28, 1990, at Nelson Mandela's rally at Tiger Stadium.

Personal life and death
Franklin married Thomas Garrett and gave birth to their two children: Thomas Jr. and Sabrina. For 25 years, Franklin worked for the Boysville Holy Cross Community Center, a Detroit organization that helps homeless and disadvantaged minority children. Franklin died of cancer in Detroit, on September 7, 2002, aged 64. She is interred at Detroit's historic Woodlawn Cemetery.

Discography

Albums

Singles

References

External links

 

1938 births
2002 deaths
20th-century African-American women singers
African-American Christians
American gospel singers
Burials at Woodlawn Cemetery (Detroit)
Deaths from cancer in Michigan
Deaths from esophageal cancer
Jay Boy artists
Singers from Detroit